Xiaoshan Subdistrict is a subdistrict of Lunan District, Tangshan, Hebei, China.

History 
Xiaoshan Subdistrict was a prominent early industrial center in Tangshan, dating back to the late 19th century. In 1877, the Qing dynasty government opened a mine in the southern portion of Qiaotun, within present-day Xiaoshan Subdistrict. The area's industry propelled the area to become a major commercial hub within Tangshan prior to the Japanese invasion of China.

Geography 
The subdistrict is located within the eastern portion of Lunan District, adjacent to the Beijing–Shanhaiguan railway. The subdistrict's western border with Yonghongqiao Subdistrict is formed by Fuxing Road. Xiaoshan Subdistrict is bordered to the east by Wenhuabeihou Street Subdistrict. The subdistrict's southern border with Nüzhizhai Township is formed by Jixiang Road.

Administrative divisions 
Xiaoshan Subdistrict administers the following seven residential communities:

 Shuangqiaoli Community
 Songnanli Community
 Xiaoshanlongyili Community
 Huayuanli Community
 Lianheli Community
 Nanchangxili Community
 Nanchangdongli Community

See also
List of township-level divisions of Hebei

References

Township-level divisions of Hebei